Nemesis Game is a 2003 mystery-thriller film directed and written by Jesse Warn. The story itself involves the main character, Sara Novak (played by Carly Pope), solving complex riddles and mysterious deaths of people around her.

Plot
The main character of the movie is Sara Novak, a college student who, along with comic book store owner named Vern (played by Adrian Paul), spend their time solving riddles. The movie takes a twist when the riddles lead to the death of her friend Jeremy (played by Jay Baruchel), leaving Sara to fear whether she is someone else's game.

Cast
Carly Pope as Sara Novak  
Ian McShane as Jeff Novak  
Adrian Paul as Vern  
Rena Owen as Emily Gray  
Brendan Fehr as Dennis Reveni  
Jay Baruchel as Jeremy Curran  
Vanessa Guy as Marie  
Eve Crawford as Lea  
Richard Fitzpatrick as Tom  
Ron Pardo as News Anchor #1  
Tony Munch as Bearded Man  
Michael Kinney as Doctor  
Philip Williams as Police MC  
Victor A. Young as Professor (as Victor Young)

Awards and nominations
2003 New Zealand Film Awards

Awards:
Makeup – Barbara Barkey
Design – Peter Cosco
Editing – Bruce Lange
Cinematography – Aaron Morton

Nominations:
Best Film
Best Contribution to a Soundtrack – Frank Ilfman
Best Costume Design – Shelley Mansell
Best Director – Jesse Warn
Best Screenplay – Jesse Warn

External links

2003 films
2000s mystery thriller films
2003 psychological thriller films
2000s English-language films